Epipyrops bowringi is a moth in the Epipyropidae family. It was described by Newman in 1851. It is found in China and India.

References

Moths described in 1852
Epipyropidae